Lectionary 2005, designated by ℓ 2005 in the Gregory-Aland numbering, is a Greek manuscript of the New Testament, on parchment leaves, dated paleographically to the 10th century.

Description 

It is written in large Greek uncial letters, on 3 parchment leaves (32 by 23.5 cm), 2 columns per page, 19 lines per page. 
The codex contains some Lessons from the Gospels (evangelistarion). The manuscript has survived in a fragmentary condition. 

The codex was divided, and now two of its folios are located at the Byzantine Museum (Frg. 42) in Athens, 1 folio is located in the Bible Museum Münster (MS. 20).

See also  

 List of New Testament lectionaries 
 Textual criticism 
 Bible Museum Münster

References

External links  

 Lectionary 2005 at the CSNTM 
 Manuscripts of the Bible Museum 

 

Greek New Testament lectionaries
10th-century biblical manuscripts